The term ex-ante (sometimes written ex ante or exante) is a phrase meaning "before the event". Ex-ante or notional demand refers to the desire for goods and services that is not backed by the ability to pay for those goods and services. This is also termed as 'wants of people'. Ex-ante is used most commonly in the commercial world, where results of a particular action, or series of actions, are forecast (or intended). The opposite of ex-ante is ex-post (actual) (or ex post). Buying a lottery ticket loses you money ex ante (in expectation), but if you win, it was the right decision ex post.

Examples:
 In the financial world, the ex-ante return is the expected return of an investment portfolio.
 In the recruitment industry, ex-ante is often used when forecasting resource requirements on large future projects.

The ex-ante (and ex-post) reasoning in economic topics was introduced
mainly by Swedish economist Gunnar Myrdal in his 1927–39 work on monetary theory, who 
described it in this way:

Focusing attention on the relation between saving and investment, Myrdal argued
that one may without any contradiction consider that, as they are made by separate
agents, ex ante saving and investment decisions are not at parity in general while ex post saving and investment are recorded in bookkeeping balance exactly:
 

This analysis has become a standard tool in macroeconomics.
                                                
Prices are quantities that directly refer to a point of time: they are determined at a point of time, after an ex ante adjustment process has taken place. As for the macroeconomic quantities, Myrdal proposed to refer to the point of time at which they are calculated. 

Gunnar Myrdal further explained that ex ante disparity and ex post balance are made consistent through price changes, which result from the behavior of economic agents, which is based on ex ante anticipations:

In context of ex-ante, the Swedish economist Myrdal also dealt with the question of the unit of time, which he proposed to solve by reducing the actual time-dimension of macroeconomic variables such as income, saving and investment to a point of time:

Economist  G. L. S. Shackle claimed the importance of Gunnar Myrdal´s analysis by which saving and investment are allowed to adjust ex ante to each other. However, the reference to ex ante and ex post analysis has become so usual in modern macroeconomics that the position of John Maynard Keynes to not include it in his work was 
currently considered as an oddity, if not a mistake. As Shackle put it:

See also
 A priori
 List of Latin phrases
 Ex post facto law

References

External links
 A Methodolocical Issue: Ex Ante and Ex Post Analysis Irrelevant to Keynes's Theory of Employment
 Rules from Myrdal’s Monetary Equilibrium Adrián de León-Arias 
 Monetary Equilibrium -Claes Henrik Siver Stockholm University
 Myrdal's Analysis of Monetary Equilibrium G.L.S. Shackle

Latin words and phrases
Macroeconomics
Investment